José López Hernández, also known as Toluco (June 21, 1932 – December 16, 1972) was a Mexican professional boxer. He was one of the most popular boxers from Mexico.

Professional career
In May 1955, he beat Fili Nava to win the Mexican bantamweight title.

López vs. Monroe
His biggest fight came in Legion Stadium, Hollywood, California against the champion Boots Monroe. The bout was for the North American Bantamweight Championship and Before a capacity crowd Lopez "shocked" the crowd by stopping Monroe in just two rounds. Monroe got off to a good start, employing the long left jab for which he was noted. Near the end of the round, however, Toluco stepped in and nailed Monroe with a hard right and visibly shook him. In the second round, Lopez came out fast and dropped a still dazed Monroe three times before the referee "mercifully" put a stop to the beating.

References

External links

Boxers from the State of Mexico
Super-featherweight boxers
1932 births
1972 deaths
Mexican male boxers